Alu bharta or Aloo Chokha is dish made by mashing boiled soft potatoes and mixing chopped chilies, onion, salt and mustard oil. It is usually eaten as a side dish in India. Aloo Chokha is commonly served along with Litti bread in Bhojpuri culinary tradition.

Ingredients 
 Potatoes
 Onion 
 Pepper
 Salt
 Mustard oil

Preparation method 
First you have to boil the potatoes in a separate pot. Peel a squash, grate it and squeeze the juice. Now fry the onion and pepper in a frying pan in light oil. At this stage, the boiled potatoes should be crushed with the help of hands. Mix well with fried onion, pepper and mustard oil. Proper amount of salt should be given. Many also use boiled eggs, beans, eggplant, etc. with potatoes.

Also many use burnt pepper; It gives a different kind of taste and smell to the filling. Raw pepper powder is also used. Ghee is often used for variety and flavor.

Varieties 
Adding different ingredients to alu bharta has made different varieties:
 Mashed potato
 Beans and mashed potato

Gallery

References

Uttar Pradeshi cuisine
Bihari cuisine
Bangladeshi cuisine
Bengali cuisine
Indian cuisine
Odia cuisine